Virginia Alejandra Argueta Hernández (born October 13, 1994) is a Guatemalan model and beauty pageant titleholder of Miss Guatemala 2016 and represented Guatemala at Miss Universe 2016 in Manila, Philippines. She also won Miss World Guatemala 2017 and represented Guatemala at Miss World 2017 in Sanya, China.

She has participated in national and international beauty events as Miss Universe Guatemala, since being crowned in 2016, giving her the opportunity to represent her country. She also took part in the most televised beauty event on the planet, Miss Universe, in 2017 in the city of Manila, Philippines.

Career 
In 2016, she was crowned Miss Universe Guatemala 2016.

After competing in Miss Universe, Argueta participated in L.A.'s Fashion Week, Arts Hearts Fashion, in 2017.

References 

1994 births
Living people
Miss Guatemala
Guatemalan women
Miss World 2017 delegates
Miss Universe 2016 contestants